Nemanja Vidaković (Serbian Cyrillic: Немања Видаковић; born 29 September 1985) is a Serbian former footballer.

Career
He began his career at FK Obilić in 2005. After the 2005-06 season he was transferred to the Romanian side Pandurii Târgu-Jiu, but he only spent one season there. Then he was loaned to CSM Râmnicu Vâlcea (Romania's Liga II) for one year. In June 2008 he signed a three-year contract with the newly promoted Gaz Metan Mediaș. In 2017 he played for Napredak Kruševac.

Honours
Borac Banja Luka
Premier League of Bosnia and Herzegovina (1): 2010–11

References

External links
 
 
 
 

1985 births
Living people
Footballers from Belgrade
Serbian footballers
Serbian expatriate footballers
FK Mladi Obilić players
FK Novi Pazar players
FK Napredak Kruševac players
FK Obilić players
CS Pandurii Târgu Jiu players
SCM Râmnicu Vâlcea players
CS Gaz Metan Mediaș players
Liga I players
Expatriate footballers in Romania
FC DAC 1904 Dunajská Streda players
Slovak Super Liga players
Expatriate footballers in Slovakia
Expatriate footballers in Malaysia
Expatriate footballers in Azerbaijan
Expatriate footballers in Indonesia
FK Borac Banja Luka players
Association football forwards
Ravan Baku FC players
OFK Beograd players
Bali United F.C. players
Premier League of Bosnia and Herzegovina players
Azerbaijan Premier League players